The following are the results of the 1978 Philippine parliamentary election by region and sector.

By region

Region I – Ilocos Region

Region II – Cagayan Valley

Region III – Central Luzon

Region IV – Metro Manila

Region IV-A – Southern Tagalog

Region V – Bicol Region

Region VI – Western Visayas

Region VII – Central Visayas

Region VIII – Eastern Visayas

Region IX – Western Mindanao

Region X – Northern Mindanao

Region XI – Southern Mindanao

Region XII – Central Mindanao

By sector

Youth sector

Luzon

Visayas

Mindanao

Any region

Industrial labor sector

Luzon

Visayas

Mindanao

Agricultural labor sector

Luzon

Visayas

Mindanao

References

1978
1978 elections in the Philippines